Hi Scores is an EP by Scottish electronic music duo Boards of Canada. It was released by Skam Records in 1996. It peaked at number 34 on the UK Dance Albums Chart in 2006. "Turquoise Hexagon Sun" would later appear on the duo's 1998 debut studio album, Music Has the Right to Children.

Track listing

Personnel
Credits adapted from liner notes.

 Mike Sandison – writing, production
 Marcus Eoin – writing, production

Charts

References

External links
 

1996 EPs
Boards of Canada albums
Skam Records EPs